Abraham Lincoln Polonsky (December 5, 1910 – October 26, 1999) was an American film director, screenwriter, essayist and novelist. He was nominated for an Academy Award for Best Original Screenplay for Body and Soul but in the early 1950s was blacklisted by the Hollywood movie studios, after refusing to testify at congressional hearings of the House Un-American Activities Committee, in the midst of the McCarthy era.

Early life
Abraham Polonsky was born in New York City, the eldest son of Russian Jewish immigrants, Henry and Rebecca (née Rosoff) Polonsky. He attended DeWitt Clinton High School with classmates and lifelong friends Roy Pinney and Bernard Herrmann.

In 1928, he entered City College of New York and, following graduation, earned his law degree in 1935 at Columbia Law School. After several years of practice, mixed with teaching, he decided to devote himself to writing.

Career
Polonsky wrote essays, radio scripts and several novels before beginning his career in Hollywood. His first novel, The Goose is Cooked, written with Mitchell A. Wilson under the singular pseudonym of Emmett Hogarth, was published in 1940.

A committed Marxist, in the late 1930s Polonsky joined the Communist Party of the USA. He participated in union politics and established and edited a left-wing newspaper, The Home Front.

Polonsky signed a screenwriter's contract with Paramount Pictures before leaving the US to serve in Europe in the Office of Strategic Services during World War II (from 1943 to 1945). He worked with the French resistance to write scripts and direct programs for the clandestine OSS radio stations. He did not have the opportunity to write screenplays for the studio until after the end of the war.

In 1947, he was credited with two screenplays for Paramount:  the screenplay for Golden Earrings, directed by Mitchell Leisen, and the screenplay for Robert Rossen's independent production Body and Soul, (1947) starring John Garfield and Lilli Palmer. The screenplay was nominated for an Academy Award.

Polonsky's first film as a director, Force of Evil (1948), was not successful when released in the United States, but it was hailed as a masterpiece by film critics in England. The film, based on the novel Tucker's People by Ira Wolfert, has since become recognized as one of the great American films noir. In  1994, it was selected for preservation in the National Film Registry by the Library of Congress for being "culturally, historically, or aesthetically significant."

Hollywood blacklist
Polonsky's career as a director (and credited writer) came to an abrupt halt when he refused to testify before the congressional House Un-American Activities Committee (HUAC) in 1951. Illinois congressman Harold Velde called the director a "very dangerous citizen" at the hearings. While blacklisted, Polonsky continued to write film scripts under various pseudonyms or fronts, most of which have never been revealed.

It is known that Polonsky, along with Nelson Gidding, co-wrote the screenplay for Odds Against Tomorrow (1959), based on a novel of the same name by William McGivern. It was initially credited to Oliver Killens, who acted as a front for him. Polonsky was not given public credit for the screenplay until 1997, when the Writers Guild of America, west officially restored his name to the film under the WGA screenwriting credit system.

Later life
In 1968, Polonsky was the screenwriter for Madigan, a neo-noir film, and Polonsky used his own name in the credits. The film was directed by Don Siegel, starring Richard Widmark and Henry Fonda.

After a prolonged absence, Polonsky returned to directing in 1969 with the Western film Tell Them Willie Boy Is Here, a tale of a fugitive Native American pursued by a posse. Polonsky converted it into an allegory about racism, genocide, and persecution.

Polonsky was an uncredited scriptwriter for Mommie Dearest (1981), based on Christina Crawford's memoirs of her adoptive mother Joan Crawford. He also wrote the screenplay for The Man Who Lived at the Ritz (1981), based on a novel by A. E. Hotchner. A Marxist until his death, Polonsky publicly objected when director Irwin Winkler rewrote his script for Guilty by Suspicion (1991), a film about the Hollywood blacklist era. Winkler changed his lead character (played by Robert De Niro) to a liberal, rather than a Communist.

Polonsky received the Career Achievement Award of the Los Angeles Film Critics Association in 1999. Prior to that, Polonsky taught a philosophy class at USC School of Cinema-Television called "Consciousness and Content".  While he had resigned his membership in the Communist Party in the 1950s after rejecting Stalinism, he remained committed to Marxist political theory, stating in an interview in 1999: "I was a Communist because I thought Marxism offered the best analysis of history, and I still believe that."

Until his death, Polonsky was a virulent critic of director Elia Kazan, who had testified before HUAC and provided names to the Committee. In 1999, he was enraged when Kazan was honored by the Academy of Motion Picture Arts and Sciences for lifetime achievement, stating that he hoped Kazan would be shot onstage: "It would no doubt be a thrill in an otherwise dull evening."   Polonsky also said that his latest project was designing a movable headstone: "That way if they bury that man in the same cemetery, they can move me." Thom Andersen interviewed Polonsky in the 1990s about the events of the years when the Hollywood Ten were blacklisted for his film Red Hollywood.

Polonsky died on October 26, 1999, in Beverly Hills, California, aged 88.

Filmography
Golden Earrings (with Frank Butler and Helen Deutsch) (1947)
Body and Soul (1947)
Force of Evil (with Ira Wolfert) (1948) (also Director)
I Can Get It for You Wholesale (with Vera Caspary) (1951)
Odds Against Tomorrow (with Nelson Gidding) (1959) (uncredited)
Kraft Suspense Theatre (1965) (TV)
Seaway (1965) (TV)
Madigan (with Howard Rodman) (1968)
Tell Them Willie Boy Is Here (1969) (also Director)
Romance of a Horsethief (1971) (Director Only)
Avalanche Express (1979)
Monsignor (with Wendell Mayes) (1982)
Mommie Dearest (1981) (uncredited)

Novels and essays
The Goose is Cooked (1940) (with Mitchell A Wilson - pseudonym Emmett Hogarth)
The Enemy Sea (1943) (novel)
 The World Above (1951) (novel)
A Season Of Fear (1956)
"How the Blacklist Worked in Hollywood" (1970) (essay)
"Making Movies" (1971) (essay)
Zenia's Way (1980) (novel)
Children of Eden (1982) (unfinished novel)
To Illuminate Our Time:  The Blacklisted Teleplays of Abraham Polonsky (1993)
Body and Soul:  The Critical Edition (2002)
Force of Evil:  The Critical Edition (1996)
Odds Against Tomorrow:  The Critical Edition (1999)
You Are There Teleplays:  The Critical Edition (1997)

References

External links

Senses of Cinema: Great Directors Critical Database

1910 births
1999 deaths
Jewish American writers
Jewish socialists
20th-century American novelists
American essayists
Members of the Communist Party USA
American male screenwriters
American people of Russian-Jewish descent
Hollywood blacklist
New York (state) lawyers
DeWitt Clinton High School alumni
20th-century American lawyers
American male novelists
American male essayists
City College of New York alumni
Columbia Law School alumni
People of the Office of Strategic Services
Film directors from New York City
Screenwriters from New York (state)
20th-century essayists
20th-century American male writers
20th-century American screenwriters